Ronald Rea Romero (born 29 March 1988) is a Bolivian footballer who plays for Bolivian club Oriente Petrolero.He is a midfielder.

Club career
Rea was signed by Oriente Petrolero in January 2010, from Bolivian academy Tahuichi Academy. He played for Oriente reserves for 1 year in 2010 he was called by Gustavo Quinteros to join the first team. He made he debut on in a match against Real Potosi. His first goal was against Real Mamore in the Apertura 2010, and his first international goal was against Universidad de Chile the match ended 2-2.

References

External links
 
 

1988 births
Living people
Sportspeople from Santa Cruz de la Sierra
Bolivian footballers
Association football midfielders
Oriente Petrolero players
Club Bolívar players
Club Blooming players